Baegunsan or Mount Baegun is a mountain in Gyeonggi Province(Gyeonggi-do), South Korea. Its area extends across the cities of Uiwang, Suwon and Yongin.

See also
List of mountains in Korea

Mountains of Gyeonggi Province
Uiwang
Suwon
Yongin
Mountains of South Korea